To the Last Man may refer to:

Comics
To the Last Man, a 2014 story arc (issues 19-21) of Abe Sapien. A film poster of the 1933 western appears in #20.

Novels
To the Last Man (Grey novel), a 1921 Western novel by Zane Grey
To the Last Man (Shaara novel), a 2004 historical novel by Jeff Shaara

Films
To the Last Man (1923 film),  American silent western based on Grey's 1921 novel; directed by Victor Fleming
To the Last Man (1933 film), another American version of Grey's novel; directed by Henry Hathaway

Television
Gunsmoke: To the Last Man, a 1992 TV movie based on the TV series Gunsmoke
To the Last Man (Torchwood), an episode of Torchwood

See also
 The Last Man (disambiguation)